TOTC may refer to:
 A Tale of Two Cities (disambiguation)
 Tales of the City, a series of novels by Armistead Maupin
 Tales of the City (novel), the first novel in the series
 Tales of the City (miniseries), a 1993 television miniseries based on the book series
 Team of the century
 Trial of the century
 The Trial of the Century, a 2004 album by American rock band French Kicks
 Turn of the century (disambiguation)
 Tyndale Old Testament Commentaries, a series of Biblical commentaries published by IVP

 The Olivia Tremor Control, psychedelic band